Thysanopoda is a genus of krill, containing the following species:
Thysanopoda acutifrons Holt & Tattersall, 1905
Thysanopoda aequalis Hansen, 1905
Thysanopoda astylata Brinton, 1975
Thysanopoda cornuta Illig, 1905
Thysanopoda cristata G. O. Sars, 1883
Thysanopoda egregia Hansen, 1905
Thysanopoda microphthalma G. O. Sars, 1885
Thysanopoda minyops Brinton, 1987
Thysanopoda monacantha Ortmann, 1893
Thysanopoda obtusifrons G. O. Sars, 1883
Thysanopoda orientalis Hansen, 1910
Thysanopoda pectinata Ortmann, 1893
Thysanopoda spinicaudata Brinton, 1953
Thysanopoda tricuspidata Milne-Edwards, 1837

References

External links

Krill
Crustacean genera
Taxa named by Pierre André Latreille